BBC Three is a British television channel which broadcast from 9 February 2003 to 16 February 2016 but returned on 1 February 2022.

BBC3 or BBC Three, or similar, may also refer to:

British Broadcasting Corporation
Related to the former (then relaunched) British television channel:
BBC Three (streaming service), an internet channel launched in 2016
Fictitious or hypothetical third BBC TV channels:
BBC-3 (TV series), 1960s TV series
BBC3, a fictional TV channel in the 1971 Doctor Who serial The Daemons
BBC3, temporary channel identity adopted by BBC1 for broadcasts of puppet character Roland Rat's 1980s BBC series 
Similarly named BBC radio channels:
BBC Radio 3, a national BBC radio station, broadcast throughout the United Kingdom
BBC Three Counties Radio (3CR), a BBC local radio station broadcasting in Bedfordshire, Buckinghamshire and Hertfordshire

Other uses
Biwako Broadcasting Co., a television station (UHF channel 20 - LCN 3) licensed to Shiga Prefecture, Japan
P53 upregulated modulator of apoptosis, also known by the name Bcl-2-binding component 3 (BBC3), a biological signalling protein
 믄 (U+BBC3), a unicode character; see List of modern Hangul characters in ISO/IEC 2022–compliant national character set standards

See also

 
 BBC (disambiguation)